Labor certification (not to be confused with the Labor Condition Application, LCA) is an immigration process step in the United States of America. Its stated goal is to "protect U.S. workers and the U.S. labor market by ensuring that foreign workers seeking immigrant visa classifications are not displacing equally qualified U.S. workers".

There are several options available to U.S. employers who wish to hire foreign, non-immigrant workers on a temporary but long-term basis:  H-1B visas, L-1 visas, TN status and other options.  These temporary options are often sufficient to meet the needs of employer and employee.  When a U.S. employer wishes to hire the services of the foreign worker on a permanent basis, however, a complex sponsorship process for the green card begins, a process that can take years.  Generally (although not always) the first step in that process is labor certification.  Labor certification is a process of proving that there are no qualified U.S. workers for the position being offered.  If there are qualified U.S. workers - in fact, even generally speaking if there are even minimally qualified U.S. workers - then the foreign worker cannot be offered the position on a permanent basis.  This does not necessarily mean that the foreign worker will be immediately replaced by a qualified U.S. worker, though.  The foreign worker can still serve out the remainder of their existing U.S. temporary visa, and may well be able to re-apply for labor certification and be approved.  But it does create a substantial inconvenience for the U.S. employer who wishes to hire a foreign worker, which does provide some protection to U.S. workers, although the process is controversial.

Reduction in recruitment
The original labor certification process, used exclusively up until about 1998, involved a lengthy interview process, whereby instructions were provided after filing the case as to how the employer was to go about recruiting for the position.  After complying with those instructions, the employer needed to persuasively argue why any U.S. applicants for the position were unqualified - otherwise the petition would be denied.  Beginning in 1998, a more streamlined approach called Reduction in Recruitment (RIR) was introduced.  Under RIR, the sequence of events was reversed: the employer first did the recruiting, and then filed the case with evidence that no minimally qualified U.S. workers could be found.

RIR tended to speed processing times up somewhat, so that labor certification times which were previously measured in years began to be measured in months.  Both regular and RIR labor certification involved filing first with the Department of Labor for the individual state where the job was located (the individual state presumably being most familiar with local labor market conditions) and then, if approved at the state level, the case was then transferred to the federal Department of Labor for final approval.

Program electronic review management
In March 2005 a completely electronic labor certification system, PERM (Program Electronic Review Management), came into use.  PERM was intended to reduce labor certification times to under 60 days.  However, PERM may be creating as many backlogs as it is intended to solve.  Because of congressionally mandated annual quotas, there may not be enough visas available to grant green cards to everyone who is approved by PERM, which may have played a role in the retrogression of priority dates on September 13, 2005.

The standards used in making labor certification determinations under the PERM system would be based on:

1) whether there are not sufficient United States workers who are able, willing, qualified and available; 
2) whether the employment of the alien will have an adverse effect on the wages and working conditions of United States workers similarly employed; and
3) whether the employer has met the procedural requirements of the regulations.

The employer has the option of filing a PERM application electronically (using web-based forms and instructions) or by mail. However, the Department of Labor recommends that employers file electronically. Not only is electronic filing faster, but it would also ensure the employer has provided all required information, as an electronic application can not be submitted if the required fields are not completed. 

The employer must recruit under the standards for professional occupations, if the occupation involved is on the list of occupations, published in the PERM regulation, for which a bachelors or higher degree is a customary requirement.

For all other occupations not normally requiring a bachelor's or higher degree, employers can simply recruit under the requirements for nonprofessional occupations. Although the occupation involved in a labor certification application may be a nonprofessional occupation, the regulations do not prohibit employers from conducting more recruitment than is specified for such occupations. Therefore, if the employer is uncertain whether an occupation is considered professional or not, the employer is advised to conduct recruitment for a professional occupation.

Controversy
As with many immigration procedures, labor certification tends to be controversial.  Its backers argue that it is a rigorous procedure for determining that only foreign workers who truly have skills needed by the U.S. labor market and not readily available locally are hired.  Its critics, however, say that U.S. employers will first hire a foreigner on a long-term temporary visa, and then try to tailor the job description so that that foreigner is the only person who could possibly be hired - thus gaming the labor certification process to guarantee a favorable outcome.  However, the job requirements, as described by the petitioning employer in the labor certification application, must represent the employer’s actual minimum requirements for the job opportunity.  Those job requirements described on a labor certification application are reviewed and evaluated closely by the Department of Labor in accordance with the Code of Federal Regulations that sets forth the standards for determining the appropriate requirements for a job opportunity.  Ultimately, the employer must prove that they have not hired workers with less training or experience for jobs substantially comparable to that involved in the job opportunity.

Differences with labor condition application

Labor certification should not be confused with the Labor Condition Application, the corresponding process for temporary work visas. The differences are presented in table form below:

References

External links
USCIS Glossary - Labor Certification
Permanent Labor Certification
iCert: DOL PERM portal

United States immigration law
Immigration to the United States
Employment of foreign-born
United States Department of Labor